Branko Đerić was the 1st prime minister of Republika Srpska from 22 April 1992–20 January 1993.

Early life 
Đerić was born in Berkovići, Rogatica, SR Bosnia and Herzegovina, SFR Yugoslavia, on 20 November 1948. He graduated from the University of Sarajevo in 1972. He defended his master's thesis at the Faculty of Economics of the University of Belgrade in 1977. He graduated from the Faculty of Economics of the University of Belgrade in 1981.

Bosnian War

Prime minister of Republika Srpska 
On 22 April 1992, the Serb Democratic Party (SDS) nominated Đerić as 1st prime minister of Republika Srpska.

After the war 
He was hired at the University of East Sarajevo in 1994. He became a full professor in 1996.

See also 

 List of prime ministers of Republika Srpska

References 


Republika Srpska
Prime ministers of Republika Srpska